The Tomkin tomato is a small, pumpkin shaped variety of tomato (Solanum lycopersicum) first grown in the United Kingdom by a British farmer in Lancaster. The Tomkin tomato is sold exclusively in a supermarket called ASDA.

Characteristics
The shape of this variety is like a pumpkin, hence the name Tomkin. It is similar to the Early Girl tomato in shape, but the size is the same as a cherry tomato. It has a very sweet taste.

See also
 List of tomato cultivars

References

Tomato cultivars